Raudha Athif (18 May 1996 – 29 March 2017) was a Maldivian Vogue model and medical student who was killed in Rajshahi, Bangladesh.

Biography 
Raudha studied in Hiriya School and Villa International High School in the Maldives. She did an environmental campaign on Maldivian National Television when she was 14. Raudha became known in the Maldives in 2014 after a photoshoot with a Maldivian photographer. She was featured on the cover of Vogue India in October 2016. She started medical school in Islami Bank Medical College in Rajshahi, Bangladesh. She had a scholarship from the Department of Higher Education of Maldives.

Death and controversy 
Raudha was found dead in her dorm room in Rajshahi Islami Bank Medical College on 29 March 2017. A post-mortem was carried out in Rajshahi Medical College Hospital. The post-mortem began before her father gave his consent. Her family alleged she was killed by an Islamic extremist for "refusing to wear Islamic clothing". The post-mortem by three doctors concluded it was a suicide. Her death was primarily investigated by Rajshahi Metropolitan Police, who were aided by a visiting Maldives Police Service team. She was buried in Hetemkha Graveyard, Rajshahi. Her funeral was attended by her family members and the Maldivian Ambassador to Bangladesh, Aishath Shann Shakir.

Raudha's father, Mohamed Athif, is also a doctor and disputes her death was a suicide. Her father filed a case on 10 April 2017 against Sirat Parvin, a Kashmiri student and her roommate. On 24 April 2017 her body was exhumed by the Criminal Investigation Department who performed a second autopsy. According to a Criminal Investigation Department investigation, Raudha committed suicide. Her death was investigated by 60 Minutes in Australia who suggested there might be foul play involved.

See also
List of unsolved deaths

References

1997 births
2017 deaths
Maldivian models
Vogue (magazine) people
Death conspiracy theories